Celinus "Clem" Graver was a politician in Illinois who was kidnapped on June 11, 1953. He was a precinct captain on Chicago’s west side, and organized voters for Republicans. He served as a state representative who notably broke with the bloc over what became called McCormick Place. He was never found.

Men escorted him away from his home after he pulled up in his driveway and he was never seen again, nor were there any suspects nor ransom demands. He was married.

References

Year of birth missing (living people)
1950s missing person cases
Republican Party members of the Illinois House of Representatives
20th-century American politicians
Missing person cases in Illinois
Politicians from Chicago